Lady Lake is a hamlet in the Canadian province of Saskatchewan.

Demographics 

References 

Designated places in Saskatchewan
Hamlets in Saskatchewan
Preeceville No. 334, Saskatchewan
Division No. 9, Saskatchewan